Starozhilovo is the name of several inhabited localities in Russia.

Urban localities 
Starozhilovo, Ryazan Oblast, a work settlement in Starozhilovsky District of Ryazan Oblast

Rural localities 
Starozhilovo, Krasnoyarsk Krai, a settlement in Podsosensky Selsoviet of Nazarovsky District of Krasnoyarsk Krai